Mary Mugyenyi is a Ugandan politician and a representative in the parliament of East African Legislative Assembly. She is the former member of parliament of Nyabushozi County in Kiruhura District. She is a wife to the former Bank of Uganda executive director Joshua Mugyenyi.

She holds a master's degree in education from Dalhousie University, Canada, and a bachelor's degree in politics and administration from Makerere University.
She is the vice chairperson for Uganda Management Institute Council and a lecturer at Makerere University. She is also served as state minister for agriculture. She is the brain behind the Nshenyi Culture Village,a community-based tourism initiative based in Ntungamo District. She is a one-of-a-kind person who believes that money is letting down the development of East African politics.

In 2013, she and Makerere Staff honored her late husband and former political lecturer Joshua Baitwa Mugyenyi at Makerere University together with Ephraim Kamuntu.

References

1973 births
United States International University alumni
Makerere University alumni
Ugandan politicians
Living people